To Oblige a Lady is a 1931 British comedy film directed by H. Manning Haynes and starring Maisie Gay, Warwick Ward, Lilian Oldland, Haddon Mason and James Carew. The film is based on a play by Edgar Wallace. It was produced at Beaconsfield Studios as a quota quickie for release as a second feature.

Premise
A couple rent a luxury flat and try to pass it off as their own in order to impress a wealthy relative.

Cast
 Maisie Gay as Mrs Harris
 Warwick Ward as George Pinder
 Lilian Oldland as Betty Pinder
 Haddon Mason as John Pendergast
 James Carew as Sir Henry Markham
 Annie Esmond as Mrs Higgins

References

Bibliography
 Chibnall, Steve. Quota Quickies: The Birth of the British 'B' Film. British Film Institute, 2007.
Wood, Linda. British Films, 1927–1939. British Film Institute, 1986.

1931 films
1931 comedy films
British comedy films
Films based on works by Edgar Wallace
British black-and-white films
1930s English-language films
Films directed by H. Manning Haynes
1930s British films
Quota quickies
Films shot at Beaconsfield Studios
British Lion Films films